

First generation

Everardo Rey 

Portrayed by: Fernando Lujan

Adult protagonist of the series. The patriarch of the Rey family. During his younger days, he used to be a bus driver. He and his then best friend, Pedro Malvido "Perico", dreamed of a wealthy life. Both of them fell in love with the gold digger's only child, Manuela San Vicente. They made a promise to leave their village for United States to get rich. In the US, Vadote and Perico worked in a gas company. Perico used his savings to buy shares of the gas. One day, Vadote made the drunk Perico to sign the transfer of ownership of the shares to him. He also hid the letters which Perico wrote to Manuela. Back in Mexico, he told Manuela that Pedro has married other woman. He then marries Manuela, and managed her property. They have three sons together; Memo, Vado and Matiás. Everardo slept with Mercedes as a revenge to Pedro for thinking about Manuela each time he sleeps with his wife. Everardo also had a son with Consuelo, the florist of the mansion. Everardo revealed that he knew Manuela's first son is still alive.

Many 
Portrayed by Ofelia Medina

Adult protagonist of the series. The only child of Uvaldo San Vicente. When she was younger, she had a child with Pedro, who was the love of her life. Her parents and Ricarda told her that her son was born dead. She then marries Everardo and had three sons. She separated from her husband after he confessed about Laureano's existence.

Manuela is portrayed as a modern, open-minded and tech-savvy woman in her 60s. She is always seen with electronic gadgets such as laptop, iPad and iPhone.

Second generation

Memo Rey 
Portrayed by Ariel Lopez Padilla

The eldest son of Everardo and Manuela. He was the favourite grandson of Uvaldo. He became a drug addict and alcoholic. His brother Vado provoked the death of his wife Andrea in Las Vegas. He was sentenced to prison for 15 years without the knowledge of his family. He returns to Mexico by the help of Matias. He swore to find justice in his return. His daughter Delfina rejected him at first. He was mistaken as a priest by Julia. They later fall in love. His grandson Beto was taken care by Juliana, Julia's mother.

Vado Rey 
Portrayed by Leonardo Garcia

The main antagonist of the series. Many and Everardo, Sr.'s second son. Dislikes his maternal grandfather for preferring Memo than him. Jealous of Memo's protectiveness towards Matias. He was married to Paola for more than 20 years. They divorced after he "killed" Ismael, whom was her lover. He has affair with his secretary Julia, whom was in love with his father before, and later with his elder brother Memo. Vado is sterile and unable to bare a child. He paid Ismael to make Paola pregnant. He caused his brother Memo to live behind bars for more than 15 years. He also planned Atilio Herran's shooting during his parents' 40th wedding anniversary.

Matías Rey 
Portrayed by Michel Brown

The main protagonist of the series. Many and Everardo, Sr.'s youngest son. Marries Lorenza despite the hatred between their families. He was to marry Aurora Longoria but he left her on their wedding day. He dislikes his family but throughout the series he slowly show the typical Rey attitude which causes a gap with Lorenza. He is portrayed as an attractive and just man, which result in both Jenny, the lawyer, and Rosario, the doctor, to fall in love with him.

Fictional Mexican people
Fictional families